The Aprilia RS250 is a two-stroke  sport bike made by the Italian motorcycle manufacturer Aprilia.

The Aprilia RS250 is a race oriented motorcycle with technology derived from Aprilia's racing experience. It is inspired by the Aprilia RSW250 Grand Prix motorcycle used by riders such as Valentino Rossi, Max Biaggi and Loris Capirossi in MotoGP races.

History
The RS250 was designed by Aprilia to resemble their GP250 bike to celebrate their success in the championship. The Aprilia RS250 is powered by a modified Suzuki RGV250 (VJ22) engine which is prepared by Aprilia, changes include a revised ECU, Aprilia-designed expansion chambers, barrels and airbox. The twin 34 mm flat slide Mikuni carburettors are retained from the RGV.

Chassis
The frame is a cast twin spar aluminium/magnesium alloy with thin-walled monocoque reinforcements, with the engine as a fully stressed member manufactured by Benelli for Aprilia. The banana swingarm is made out of the same polished aluminium alloy as the rest of the frame. The reason for the swingarm's banana shape is to allow the expansion chambers to run unobstructed under the engine to improve ground clearance in turns.

The forks are 41 mm Showa (on the MY98+ models) inverted units and are adjustable compression and rebound, the rear suspension is a Sachs mono-shock which is adjustable for preload, compression and rebound. The front brakes of the RS 250 are Brembo dual 298 mm discs with Brembo Oro four-piston calipers. The rear brake is a single 220 mm disc with a Brembo twin-piston caliper.

The front & rear rims are lightweight, 5 spokes, cast aluminum rims are 3.50x17 up front (3.0x17 on the older models) and 4.50x17 out back that require tires of 120/70x17 and 160/60x17, respectively.

Instrument panel
The RS gauges feature a digital instrument panel that gives the rider a variety of information. It will display maximum and average speed readings in kilometers or miles per hour, an adjustable rev limiter warning zone indicator, water temperature in choice of scale, battery charge indicator, a clock, and a chronometer that can remember up to 40 lap times.

Revision
In 1998, Aprilia released an all new look for the RS250, also referred to as RS250GP1 to celebrate Aprilia's victory in the 250 cc GP racing class. Its appearance is similar to Marco Melandri's RSWGP250 bike, with the same engine and frame as the pre-1998 model. The bike has a dummy ram-air intake. Changes include:
Revised overall bike styling with more modern senses.
New Showa front forks and adjustable rear ride height
New style instrument panel with new functionality.
 New rims and tyres: the front rim is now a 3.5x17, instead of 3.0x17 as used on pre-1998 model. The front tire is a 120/60x17 instead of the 110/70x17 mounted on the pre-1998

References 

RS250
Sport bikes
Motorcycles introduced in 1995
Two-stroke motorcycles